FERM, RhoGEF and pleckstrin domain-containing protein 1 is a protein that in humans is encoded by the FARP1 gene.

This gene was originally isolated through subtractive hybridization due to its increased expression in differentiated chondrocytes versus dedifferentiated chondrocytes. The resulting protein contains a predicted ezrin-like domain, a Dbl homology domain, and a pleckstrin homology domain. It is believed to be a member of the band 4.1 superfamily whose members link the cytoskeleton to the cell membrane. Two alternatively spliced transcript variants encoding distinct isoforms have been found for this gene.

References

Further reading

External links